Falsapomecyna is a genus of longhorn beetles of the subfamily Lamiinae, containing the following species:

 Falsapomecyna albolineata Breuning, 1942
 Falsapomecyna mourgliae Téocchi, 1988

References

Desmiphorini